Blind Hearts is a 1921 American silent drama film produced by Hobart Bosworth who stars along with Madge Bellamy and Raymond McKee. This film was made prior to Bosworth's next film The Sea Lion, a film now in Public Domain and out on DVD. Blind Hearts survives in a copy in the Library of Congress.

Plot
{this is the plot of the broken heart.}

Cast
Hobart Bosworth as Lars Larson
Wade Boteler as John Thomas
Irene Blackwell as Mrs. Thomas
Collette Forbes as Hilda Larson
Madge Bellamy as Julia Larson
Raymond McKee as Paul Thomas
William Conklin as James Curdy
Lule Warrenton as Rita
Henry Hebert as James Bradley

References

External links

1921 films
American silent feature films
Films directed by Rowland V. Lee
Silent American drama films
1921 drama films
American black-and-white films
1921 directorial debut films
Films with screenplays by Joseph F. Poland
1920s American films